Justin Deeley (born February 1, 1986) is an American actor and model. He is known for his roles on the television series 90210 and Drop Dead Diva.

Career
Deeley played the recurring role of California cowboy Austin Tallridge in the fourth season of The CW's 90210. From 2013 to 2014, he played the regular role of Paul, Jane's guardian angel, on the Lifetime original series Drop Dead Diva.

Personal life
Deeley was born on February 1, 1986, in Louisville, Kentucky. He has an older brother named Blake.

Filmography

References

External links
 

1986 births
20th-century American male actors
21st-century American male actors
American male film actors
American male television actors
Living people
Male actors from Louisville, Kentucky
Male models from Kentucky